Naughty or Nice is a Christmas album, as well as the third and final studio album by American girl group 3LW, released in 2002. The album was recorded without Naturi Naughton who had recently left the group.

The album features nine original songs with Christmas-themed lyrics and a cover of the Christmas classic "Have Yourself A Merry Little Christmas". Adrienne Bailon and Kiely Williams would later re-record the song with Sabrina Bryan as the Cheetah Girls for the 2007 compilation, Disney Channel Holiday.

Despite being a Christmas album, some of the songs on Naughty or Nice feature more mature content similar to that of A Girl Can Mack, and the album is largely hip-hop influenced. The mature content and hip-hop sound of the album would heavily contrast the R&B and pop sound of 3LW's debut album. Bailon and Williams would later go on to record as The Cheetah Girls.

Released just weeks after A Girl Can Mack, Naughty or Nice did not chart.

Track listing

References

2002 Christmas albums
Christmas albums by American artists
Contemporary R&B Christmas albums
3LW albums
Albums produced by Troy Taylor (record producer)